William Kyriakos Jr. (born 3 September 1972) is a Brazilian former professional tennis player.

Kyriakos, who comes from São Paulo, represented Brazil at the 1991 Pan American Games in Havana. He won a silver medal in the mixed doubles competition, partnering Cláudia Chabalgoity, as well as a gold medal in the team event. The team of Kyriakos, Nelson Aerts and Marcelo Saliola defeated Puerto Rico in the final.

On the professional tour, Kyriakos had a career best singles ranking of 266 in the world and made an ATP Tour main draw appearance as a qualifier at the Brasília Open, held once only in 1991. He lost in the first round to José Daher.

References

External links
 
 

1972 births
Living people
Brazilian male tennis players
Tennis players at the 1991 Pan American Games
Pan American Games medalists in tennis
Pan American Games gold medalists for Brazil
Pan American Games silver medalists for Brazil
Tennis players from São Paulo
Medalists at the 1991 Pan American Games
21st-century Brazilian people
20th-century Brazilian people